Abijah Cheever (May 23, 1760 – April 21, 1843) was an American surgeon and politician from Saugus, Massachusetts.

Early life
Cheever was born on May 23, 1760, in Saugus. He was a descendant of Ezekiel Cheever, longtime headmaster of the Boston Latin School. Cheever spent much of his youth working on his family's farm.

American Revolution
On the evening before the Battle of Lexington and Concord, Cheever ran bullets from a mold over a fire for the muskets of his brothers, who took part in the battle the following day.

In 1779 Cheever graduated from Harvard College. He then studied medicine and surgery under John Warren and obtained his M. D. in 1782.

On May 13, 1782 Cheever was commissioned as a surgeon aboard Tartar, a ship fitted by the Commonwealth of Massachusetts for service in the American Revolution. Once the war ended, Cheever was exchanged and returned to Massachusetts.

Boston
After the war, Cheever settled in Boston's North End, where he worked as a physician and surgeon. On July 5, 1789, he married Elizabeth Scott. The couple had three children before her death on July 5, 1795. On October 16, 1798, he married Sally Williams, with whom he had two children.

Return to Saugus
Cheever returned to Saugus in 1806 and remained there for the rest of his life. Cheever was one of Saugus' largest land owners with over two-hundred acres. He was also one of Saugus' few slave holders. On his family's land he built an elegant home that became well known throughout the region.

In 1815, Cheever was elected to Saugus' first Board of Selectmen, Assessors, and Overseers of the Poor.

In 1821, 1829, 1830, and 1831, Cheever represented Saugus in the Massachusetts House of Representatives. During his political career, Cheever frequently competed with his brother Joseph Cheever.

Cheever died on April 21, 1843.

References

1760 births
1843 deaths
American military doctors
Physicians from Massachusetts
American Revolutionary War prisoners of war held by Great Britain
American surgeons
Harvard College alumni
Massachusetts Federalists
Members of the Massachusetts House of Representatives
People from North End, Boston
People from Saugus, Massachusetts
Boston Latin School alumni